Sapienic acid is a fatty acid that is a major component of human sebum.  Unique to humans, it takes its scientific name from the root sapiens. The equivalent fatty acid in mouse sebum is palmitoleic acid. Sapienic acid salts, esters, anion, and conjugate base are known as sapienates.

Deficient production of sapienic acid has been implicated in the development of atopic dermatitis, and sapienic acid has potent antibacterial activity against pathogens like Staphylococcus aureus. Reduced omega-3 intake has been linked to lower sapienic acid levels in sebum.

Delta-6-desaturation of palmitic acid leads to the biosynthesis of sapienic acid. In other tissues linoleic acid is the target for delta 6 desaturase, but linoleic acid is degraded in sebaceous cells, allowing the enzyme to desaturate palmitic to sapienic acid. A two-carbon extension product of sapienic acid, sebaleic acid, is also present in sebum.
Sapienic acid can lead to the decanal which is likely what mosquitoes use to identify human prey.

References

External links 
Waxes, The Lipid Library

Fatty acids
Alkenoic acids